Live! is a live album by The Police, released in 1995 on compact disc and cassette tape. It is the first live album of the band and one of only two covering the period when it was active, the other being Around The World (2022). A live album from the reunion tour, Certifiable: Live in Buenos Aires, was released in 2008.

Contents
According to Andy Summers, the idea of releasing an album of live material by The Police went back as far as 1982. Up until that point, a few live tracks had only surfaced on B-sides and compilations such as Urgh! A Music War (1980). The plan was to have a new album of the band to act as a stopgap between Ghost in the Machine (1981) and Synchronicity (1983). The record was mixed and mastered in Canada but never released.<ref>Andy Summers, One Train Later, Piatkus, London, 2007</ref> Similar plans took place in 1984 at the tail of the band's Synchronicity tour, but the project was shelved again, this time in favour of a greatest hits album (Every Breath You Take: The Singles). In 1995, thanks to the technical possibilities and greater running time offered by the CD format, the idea regained momentum and Summers was invited to produce. The album features the band performing at two very distinct periods of its career. Disc one contains almost the complete concert on 27 November 1979 at the Orpheum Theatre in Boston, Massachusetts. It features mostly material from the first two albums, Outlandos d'Amour and Reggatta de Blanc, as well as songs only released as singles or B-sides such as "Fall Out" and "Landlord". The performance was broadcast by the WBCN (FM) radio in Boston. Disc two contains excerpts from two concerts on 2–3 November 1983 in Atlanta, Georgia at The Omni during the Synchronicity tour for the album of the same name. On this occasion the band was augmented by three backing vocalists. Both shows were widely known to fans as they had been circulating in bootleg format for many years. The 1983 shows were also featured in the 1984 Synchronicity Concert VHS and the 2005 DVD release, and a live version of "Tea in the Sahara" had been released as the B-side of "King of Pain" in 1984.Live! contributed to refresh the popularity of The Police about a decade after their break-up. It also had the merit of showcasing the band's live activity, and their propensity for rearranging and extending known songs such as "Roxanne" and "Walking on the Moon". An edited version of "Can't Stand Losing You" from the Boston performance was released as a single and reached number 27 in the UK charts, while the album itself reached number 25.

ReceptionLive! was generally well received. David Sinclair in Q magazine noted how the album added an important dimension to the band's recorded legacy by offering a reminder of why The Police were one of the great performing acts of their day. Paul Colbert from Encore Magazine wrote: "It may have taken 10 years for a live album to materialise, but these two CDs were worth the wait, capturing two essential periods, two indispensable sets of material". Andrew Abrahams emphasised the difference between the two performances, observing how the one in Boston "captures a hungry rock band on its ascent" while the one in Atlanta "is more predictable, revealing a super-group that has settled into fame and commercial acceptability". In a November 1993 interview with Q magazine, Sting seemed to agree on this point: "I remember those small gigs so much better than the stadium shows. I can remember pretty well every night of the first tour: which gigs had tricky stairs to negotiate with the gear; what was said in the dressing room; which encores we did. But a stadium just looks like a stadium".

Track listing
All songs written by Sting, except where noted.

Disc one (1979 - Orpheum WBCN/Live in Boston)

Disc two (1983 - Synchronicity Concert/Live in Atlanta)

For Record Store Day, 12 June 2021, discs one and two were released separately as Live! Vol. 1 Boston 1979 and Live! Vol. 2 Atlanta 1983'' on double LP blue and red colored vinyl, respectively.

Personnel
The Police
Andy Summers – guitar, Taurus pedals, backing vocals, lead vocals on "Be My Girl – Sally", keyboards
Sting – bass, lead vocals, synthesizers, oboe
Stewart Copeland – drums, percussion, xylophone, backing vocals
Additional personnel (disc two only)
Michelle Cobb – backing vocals
Dolette McDonald – backing vocals
Tessa Niles – backing vocals

Production
Producer: Andy Summers
Executive producers: The Police and Miles Copeland III
Engineers: Wolfgang Amadeus and Eddie King
Assistant engineer: Jun Murakawa
Photography: Lynn Goldsmith and Jill Furmanovsky
Art direction and design: Norman Moore

Charts

Certifications

References

The Police live albums
1995 live albums
A&M Records live albums
Live new wave albums